Rebecca Ross Haywood (born October 12, 1968) is an assistant United States attorney in the Western District of Pennsylvania and is a former nominee to be a United States circuit judge of the United States Court of Appeals for the Third Circuit.

Early life and education

Haywood was born on October 12, 1968, in McKeesport, Pennsylvania and raised in the neighboring town of Elizabeth. She received her Artium Baccalaureus degree, cum laude, in 1990 from Princeton University. She then attended the University of Michigan Law School, where she served as an Associate Editor on the Michigan Law Review and obtained her Juris Doctor, magna cum laude, in 1994.

Career

After graduating from law school, Haywood served as a law clerk for Judge Alan N. Bloch of the United States District Court for the Western District of Pennsylvania, from 1994 to 1996. From 1996 to 1997, she worked in the Pittsburgh office of the law firm of Jones, Day, Reavis & Pogue (now Jones Day). She served as an assistant United States attorney for the Western District of Pennsylvania from 1997 to 2001, where she handled civil matters, including representing federal agencies in employment and medical malpractice cases. From 2001 to 2003, she again clerked for Judge Alan N. Bloch. In 2003, Haywood returned to the civil division of the United States Attorney's office for the Western District of Pennsylvania, where she was promoted to appellate chief in 2010. As part of the office's management team, she regularly consults on and reviews filings for the office. In addition, Haywood frequently practices before the United States Court of Appeals for the Third Circuit and confers with trial attorneys on cases before the Western District of Pennsylvania. During her time in the United States Attorney's office, Haywood has been actively involved in workplace management and training, serving as a member of the executive and training committees since 2011, as well as serving as the coordinator for prevention of workplace harassment from 2004 to 2010.  In addition, she is actively involved in the community and regularly speaks to students and legal organizations about the law and her career.

Expired nomination to court of appeals

On March 15, 2016, President Barack Obama nominated Haywood to serve as a United States circuit judge of the United States Court of Appeals for the Third Circuit, to the seat vacated by Judge Marjorie Rendell, who took senior status on July 1, 2015. Her nomination expired on January 3, 2017, with the end of the 114th Congress.

See also
 Barack Obama judicial appointment controversies

References

1968 births
Living people
20th-century American women lawyers
20th-century American lawyers
21st-century American women lawyers
21st-century American lawyers
Assistant United States Attorneys
Jones Day people
Pennsylvania lawyers
People from McKeesport, Pennsylvania
Princeton University alumni
University of Michigan Law School alumni